Exide (Exide Technologies) is an American multinational lead-acid batteries manufacturing company.

Exide may also refer to:

 Exide lead contamination
 Exide Industries, Indian battery manufacturer
 Exide Life Insurance, Indian insurance company

See also
 DieHard (brand)
 Yuasa-Exide Inc, Japanese battery manufacturer
 1999 Exide NASCAR Select Batteries 400, a 1999 race